Andreas Schlüter is a 1942 German historical drama film directed by Herbert Maisch and starring Heinrich George, Mila Kopp and Olga Tschechowa. It portrays the life of the eighteenth century German architect Andreas Schlüter.

The film's sets were designed by the art directors Hermann Asmus, Kurt Herlth and Robert Herlth.

Cast
 Heinrich George as Andreas Schlüter
 Mila Kopp as Elisabeth Schlüter
 Olga Tschechowa as Countess Vera Orlewska
 Theodor Loos as Prince Friedrich III.
 Dorothea Wieck as Princess Charlotte
 Marianne Simson as Leonore Schlüter
 Karl John as  Bildhauer Martin Böhme, ihr Bräutigam
 Herbert Hübner as Minister Johann von Wartenberg
 Ernst Fritz Fürbringer as Johann Friedrich Eosander von Göthe
 Eduard von Winterstein as Naumann, ein Freund Schlüters
 Emil Heß as Counsellor Dankelmann
 Max Gülstorff as Geheimrat Kraut
 Robert Taube as Gottfried Wilhelm Leibniz
 Paul Dahlke as Ore Caster Johann Jacobi
 Christian Kayßler as Prince von Anhalt-Dessau
 Trude Haefelin as Mrs. von Pöllnitz
 Franz Schafheitlin as Mr. von Harms
 Otto Graf as Count Flemming
 Ernst Legal as Professor Sturm
 Paul Westermeier as Gießmeister Wenzel
 Ernst Rotmund as Grünberg
 Karl Hannemann as Dietze
 Peter Elsholtz as Der Agitator
 Hans Meyer-Hanno as Der Bauführer
 Helmut Heyne as Der Zeichner
 Carl Günther as Der Rittmeister
 Herwart Grosse as Sekretär bei Wartenberg
 Valy Arnheim as Zeremonienmeister
 Hans Waschatko as Obermarschall
 Klaus Pohl as Ein Kommissionsmitglied

References

Bibliography

External links 
 

1942 films
Films of Nazi Germany
German biographical drama films
1940s biographical drama films
1940s German-language films
Films directed by Herbert Maisch
Films set in the 17th century
Films set in the 1700s
Films set in Berlin
Films set in Prussia
Terra Film films
German historical drama films
1940s historical drama films
German black-and-white films
1940s German films